Çatalağaç is a village in the Gölbaşı District, Adıyaman Province, Turkey. The village is populated by Kurds and Turks and had a population of 317 in 2021. The Kurdish population adhere to Sunni Islam, while both Alevism and Sunni Islam is present among the local Turkish population 

The hamlet of Keralmaz, Köşüklü and Lordon is attached to the village.

References

Villages in Gölbaşı District, Adıyaman Province
Kurdish settlements in Adıyaman Province